Alkidemos or Alcidemos (defender of the people, demos) is a divine epithet, attested only by the Roman historian Livy (42.51), for the goddess Athena worshipped at Pella, Macedonia. A similar Macedonian epithet of Athena was Alcis. Athena Alkidemos with thunderbolt and shield (aegis) was a usual depiction in Hellenistic tetradrachms.

References
Coins of the Macedonians By Martin Price  Page 27

External links

Antigonos Gonatas  Tetradrachm

Alkidemos
Religion in ancient Macedonia
Indo-Greek religions and philosophy
Ancient Pella
Hellenistic deities
Ancient Greek military art